

This is a list of the National Register of Historic Places listings in Sandoval County, New Mexico, United States.

This is intended to be a complete list of the properties and districts on the National Register of Historic Places in Sandoval County, New Mexico, United States.  Latitude and longitude coordinates are provided for many National Register properties and districts; these locations may be seen together in a map.

There are 63 properties and districts listed on the National Register in the county, including 5 National Historic Landmarks. All of the places listed on the national register are also recorded on the State Register of Cultural Properties with the exception of Big Bead Mesa, Puye Ruins, and Sandia Cave. In addition to these, Jemez State Monument and Kuaua Ruin are New Mexico Historic Sites.

Current listings

|}

See also

 List of National Historic Landmarks in New Mexico
 National Register of Historic Places listings in New Mexico

References

Sandoval